Berlin Correspondent is a 1942 American film.

Plot
Dana Andrews portrays an American radio correspondent reporting from within Nazi Germany, whose principal source of information is an elderly philatelist.  His reports prove so embarrassing to the regime that Captain von Rau sends his own fiancée, Karen Hauen (Virginia Gilmore), to compromise the reporter.  As the philatelist is sent off to a concentration camp, it develops that she and the reporter are falling for each other, and the elderly source was actually her own father.

Cast 

 Virginia Gilmore as Karen Hauen
 Dana Andrews as Bill Roberts
 Mona Maris as Carla
 Martin Kosleck as Captain von Rau
 Sig Ruman as Dr. Dietrich
 Kurt Katch as Weiner
 Erwin Kalser as Mr. Rudolph Hauen
 Torben Meyer as Manager
 William Edmunds as Hans Gruber
 Hans Schumm as Gunther
 Leonard Mudie as George, English Prisoner
 Hans von Morhart as The Actor
 Curt Furburg as Doctor 
 Henry Rowland as Pilot
 Christian Rub as Prisoner

External links 
 

1942 films
American World War II propaganda films
Films set in Berlin
20th Century Fox films
Films directed by Eugene Forde
American black-and-white films
Films about journalists